Jay Burleson is an American filmmaker from Hartselle, Alabama.

Features

Feast of the Vampires 
In 2009, Burleson shot his first feature film, Feast of the Vampires. It was intended to pay homage to 1980s films such as Fright Night and The Monster Squad.
In fall 2009, the film was premiered at the Southern Shorts Film Festival in Athens, Atlanta, and won the Audience Choice Award for Best Film. The film was self-released on DVD in February 2010 and later became available on Amazon and Amazon on Demand.

The film takes place in a Southern town with a vampire curse. A normal young man is trapped in a Southern plantation and must outwit an African American vampire and his Native American housekeeper in order to save a farmer's beautiful daughter with whom the young man has fallen in love. The film was transferred to VHS and is presented by a host along the lines of Robert Osborne. The film contains many camp elements and is considered a B-movie.

The film has received positive reviews from The Dollar Bin Horror Blog and Oh-The-Horror.com. Rhonny Rheaper of Dollar Bin Horror Blog called the film "A ton of fun to watch..entertaining as hell!" Brett G of Oh-The-Horror praised Burleson for creating a stylish film and commended him for working well within a very limited budget, noting, "I enjoy this kind of stuff because I like to see enthusiasm shine through; it does here in spades."

In April 2011, the film was shown on the internet version of Creature Feature which is hosted by Count Gore De Vol.

The Nobodies 
In 2011, Burleson started working on a feature film titled The Nobodies, which combines pseudo-documentary sequences about the making of a fictitious low-budget horror film with sequences from the horror movie in question. The B-horror/comedy portions are shot on VHS. The film stars Lane Hughes (You're Next), Bill Pacer, Hannah Hughes (V/H/S/2) and Danny Vinson. The Nobodies premiered in 2017 at the Sidewalk Film Festival, where it won the Special Jury Prize for Best Alabama Film.

Filmography

As director
 Feast of the Vampires (2010)
 Kristin Grace from Outer Space (2010)
 Anathema Arienette (2015)
 The Nobodies (2017)

References

External links
 
Feast of the Vampires trailer

American male screenwriters
Film directors from Alabama
Horror film directors
Living people
People from Hartselle, Alabama
Year of birth missing (living people)